Sarah Steyaert (born 27 November 1986, in Bordeaux) is a French sports sailor. The 2008 world champion in the Laser Radial, she finished in 5th place at the 2008 Summer Olympics. At the 2012 Summer Olympics, she competed in the Women's Laser Radial class, finishing in 16th place.

References

External links
 
 
 
 

1986 births
Living people
French female sailors (sport)
Olympic sailors of France
Sailors at the 2008 Summer Olympics – Laser Radial
Sailors at the 2012 Summer Olympics – Laser Radial
Sailors at the 2016 Summer Olympics – 49er FX
49er FX class sailors
Sportspeople from Bordeaux
21st-century French women